= Groton Town, Virginia =

Unincorporated community in Virginia, United States

Coordinates: 37°51′59″N 75°35′13″W

Groton Town is an unincorporated community in Accomack County, Virginia, United States.
